Valentina Grigoryevna Vorontsova (Валентина Григорьевна Воронцова, born 26 July 1982) is a Russian female water polo player. 
She was a member of the Russia women's national water polo team, playing as goalkeeper.

She was a part of the team at the 2004 Summer Olympics and 2008 Summer Olympics. On club level she played for Kinef Kirishi in Russia.

See also
 Russia women's Olympic water polo team records and statistics
 List of women's Olympic water polo tournament goalkeepers
 List of World Aquatics Championships medalists in water polo

References

External links
 

1982 births
Living people
People from Gelendzhik
Russian female water polo players
Water polo goalkeepers
Olympic water polo players of Russia
Water polo players at the 2004 Summer Olympics
Water polo players at the 2008 Summer Olympics
Sportspeople from Krasnodar Krai
21st-century Russian women